Ottilia Reizman ( 11 September 1914 O.S. /24 September 1914 (N.S.)-22 April 1986) was a camerawoman and filmmaker. During World War II, she was one of only two women camera operators allowed on the front lines. Her work was recognized by the Stalin Prize twice, in 1949 and 1951.

Early life
Ottilia Boleslavovna Reizman, known as "Otya" was born on 24 September 1914 in Minsk, in the Russian Empire, now Belarus. In 1927, Reizman began working for Belarusfilm. She attended VGIK's camera school at a time when very few women were allowed to enter the field.

Career
Graduating from VGIK in 1935, Reizman began working at the Moscow Newsreel Studio. She also worked at the Soyuzkinochronika, both were precursors to the current Central Studio for Documentary Film (CSDF), as an assistant camera operator. Reizman took part in the filming of the Great Women's Automobile Race of 1936 and filming of the miners in Kuzbass. The CSDF employed ninety-eight cameramen and only two women, Reizman and Masha Sukhova (ru). In 1938, she was arrested and charged with counter-revolutionary activities (ru) under Article 58 of the Penal Code, but after examination of the evidence, the charges were dismissed.

When World War II began, both Reizman and Sukhova asked to be sent to film the action, but were relegated to film behind the German lines accompanying the partisan units under the command of "Batya", a pseudonym for Grigory Linkov (ru). During a German offensive against the partisans  Sukhova was killed, when the camera operators were surrounded and had to break through the lines to run for cover. Upon her return to Moscow, Reizman was decorated with two military honors, Medal "Partisan of the Patriotic War" and Order of the Patriotic War, both in the second degree. After Belarus was liberated, she was sent to Hungary to film military action there. Some of Reizman's 1944 footage from Budapest was used in the Nuremberg Trials. She worked with the group filming the 2nd Ukrainian Front, the Far Eastern Front and the arrival of the Russians in Czechoslovakia after the German capitulation.

In 1947, Reizman was part of the crew which filmed a full-length documentary, Moscow is the Capital of the USSR, which gave the history of the city during the Russian Revolution, the Great Patriotic War and reconstruction in the post-war period. The following year, she participated in the creation of another full-length film, Guardian of the World. She received the Stalin Prize in the second degree for these two works. In 1949, Reizman filmed Glory of Labor, receiving a second Stalin Prize; this one in the third degree.

Between 1965 and 1973, Reizman was the director of the CDFS newsreel series Pioneering. The most noted films of this series were the tenth and eleventh films which featured the Orlyonok's All-Union Children's Arts Festival of 1967. After his breakup with Klavdiya Shulzhenko,  and Reizman married, but he returned to Shulzhenko in 1976.

Death and legacy
Reizman died on 22 April 1986 in Moscow, USSR.

References

Citations

Bibliography

1914 births
1986 deaths
Film people from Minsk
Russian women photographers
Documentary photographers
Russian women in World War II
Soviet photographers
Women photojournalists